Bier Point is a projecting headland on the eastern side of Campbell Glacier,  northeast of Mount Queensland, in Victoria Land. It was mapped by the United States Geological Survey from surveys and from U.S. Navy air photos, 1955–63, and named by the Advisory Committee on Antarctic Names for Jeffrey W. Bier, a biologist in the McMurdo Station winter party, 1966.

References 

Headlands of Victoria Land
Borchgrevink Coast